The 2019 AFF Beach Soccer Championship is the third edition of the AFF Beach Soccer Championship, the premier regional beach soccer championship. This edition will features three of the members of the ASEAN Football Federation (AFF) and two invited teams inside Asia.

Organised by the AFF, the tournament takes place between 13 and 17 November in Chonburi, Thailand, featuring five teams.

Vietnam are the defending champions.

Teams
A total of 5 teams enter the tournament.

Group stage
All times are local time: UTC+7.

Winners

References

External links
AFF BEACH SOCCER CHAMPIONSHIP, at aseanfootball.org

AFF Beach Soccer Championship
2019 in beach soccer
AFF Beach Soccer Championship
International association football competitions hosted by Thailand
AFF